Calypso's Cave (Maltese: L-ghar ta' Calisso) is a natural cave, located on the western side of the Ramla bay, in Xagħra, Gozo. The cave is alleged to be the one referenced in The Odyssey as the cave where the nymph Calypso kept Odysseus prisoner for seven years after his ship was shipwrecked after a fierce storm. The cave is currently closed to the public for fear of collapse. The cave is commonly confused with Tal' Mixta Cave, which is located on the other side of the bay, within the confines of the Nadur local council.

References 

Caves of Malta
Calypso (mythology)